D418 branches off to the south from D2 east of the eastern end of Osijek bypass towards Osijek Airport.

The road, as well as all other state roads in Croatia, is managed and maintained by Hrvatske ceste, state owned company.

Road junctions and populated areas

Sources

State roads in Croatia
Osijek-Baranja County